Harry Joseph Costello (November 9, 1891 – August 24, 1968) was an American college football player and coach who later served as an officer in the Allied intervention in the Russian Civil War.

Early years
The son of Patrick Costello, he was born around 1892.

Georgetown University
He was an alumnus of Georgetown University, where he has been described as a "legendary quarterback."

1911
Costello was a halfback selected for Outing magazine's "Football Honor List for 1911" picked by coaches from the East and West.  The only other southern player on the list was Ray Morrison.

1912
In 1912 Georgetown won the South Atlantic Intercollegiate Athletic Association (SAIAA) posting an 8–1 record with its only loss to 1912 Carlisle Indians football team under first-year head coach Frank Gargan. Nathan Stauffer of Collier's Weekly selected Costello as his All-Southern quarterback.

1913
He was captain in his final season of 1913.

Coaching career

Costello was the head football at the College of Detroit for the 1915 and 1916 seasons. His coaching record at Detroit was 4–7–2.

Soldier in Russia
Costello joined the United States Army and trained at Fort Sheridan. Elements of the 85th Infantry Division, including Costellos formation, went to Russia as part of the Allied intervention in the Russian Civil War, where they were stationed in Arkhangelsk.

Later life
In 1957, he was living in Waterford, Virginia. He died in Washington, D.C. in 1968.

Head coaching record

Publications
 Harry J. Costello:Why Did We Go to Russia?, University of Michigan Library , Detroit, 1920

References

1890s births
1968 deaths
American football quarterbacks
Detroit Titans football coaches
Georgetown Hoyas football players
South Carolina Gamecocks football coaches
All-Southern college football players
United States Army officers
People from Meriden, Connecticut
People from Waterford, Virginia
Coaches of American football from Connecticut
Players of American football from Connecticut